Eastern Air Lines Flight 304, a Douglas DC-8 flying from New Orleans International Airport to Washington Dulles International Airport, crashed on February 25, 1964. All 51 passengers and 7 crew were killed. Among the dead were American singer and actor Kenneth Spencer and Marie-Hélène Lefaucheux, a women's and human rights activist and member of the French delegation to the United Nations.

Sequence of events
Flight 304 left New Orleans International Airport for Atlanta at 2:01 a.m. Central Standard Time on the second leg of a flight from Mexico City to New York City, with intermediate stops at New Orleans, Atlanta, and Washington, D.C. The aircraft disappeared from radar nine minutes after takeoff, at 2:10 a.m. Good visibility and calm winds prevailed at the time of the accident, although light rain was also falling.

Investigation
The subsequent investigation concluded that the jet crashed into Lake Pontchartrain en route due to "degradation of aircraft stability characteristics in turbulence, because of abnormal longitudinal trim component positions."

The flight data recorder tape was too damaged to help the investigation. Instead, investigators used the maintenance records of the crashed aircraft and of other DC-8s, to conclude that the pilots had trimmed the horizontal stabilizer to the full nose-down position, to counter the excessive nose-up attitude that, in turn, was caused by a malfunctioning pitch trim compensator that had extended too far. Once the upset occurred, it was not possible to trim the horizontal stabilizer back to the nose-up position, because of the severe G-forces generated by the crew's pulling back on the yoke after the upset.

Victims
American singer Kenneth Spencer was also killed in the crash.

See also
Aviation safety
List of accidents and incidents involving commercial aircraft
Trans-Canada Air Lines Flight 831

References

External links

NTSB Brief about the crash.

Airliner accidents and incidents in Louisiana
Airliner accidents and incidents caused by pilot error
Aviation accidents and incidents in the United States in 1964
1964 in Louisiana
304
20th century in New Orleans
Accidents and incidents involving the Douglas DC-8
February 1964 events in the United States